Sahim Omar Kalifa (born 1980 in Zakho, Iraqi Kurdistan) is a Belgian-Kurdish filmmaker based in Belgium.

In 2001, he came to Belgium, and in 2008 he got his Master's degree in filmmaking at Sint-Lukas Film School, Brussels. With his short film Nan, Kalifa won the Best Flemish Student Film at the Leuven International Short Film Festival.

Kalifa has won more than 100 international awards for his short films Land of the Heroes, Baghdad Messi, and Bad Hunter.

The biggest achievements so far are:

A-Jury Prize as Best Short film for ‘Land of the heroes’ at the 61st Berlin International Film Festival – Generation 

B- ‘Baghdad Messi’ was shortlisted for the 87th Academy Awards, the Oscars. It was one of the 10 finalists 

C- ‘Bad Hunter’ was also shortlisted for the 88th Academy Awards, the Oscars 

D- ZAGROS ‘Feature Film’:
Winner of The Grand Prix For BEST FILM at 44th Ghent Film Festival. 
Audience Award for Best Film at 18th Arras Film Festival – France.
Best Director at 18th Arras Film Festival – France.
Audience Award for Best Film at 35th Annonay Film Festival – France.
47th Rotterdam International Film Festival – Official selection. 
72nd Edinburgh Film Festival – Official Selection - UK.
35th Munich Film Festival – Official Selection.
42nd Montreal World Film Festival - Canada.
More than 10.000 visitors in the Belgian Cinemas.

Bad Hunter won the Jury Prize in the Muhr Short Film Competition at the 2014 Dubai International Film Festival.

‘Bad Hunter’ won also several international Awards at some important film festivals, like Jury Award at 59th Valladolid, 38th Montreal World, Dubai IFF and Flickerfest International Film Festival.

2014, Sahim was chosen in Istanbul as Best Kurdish film director.

In 2016 Sahim became a member of the Academy Awards ‘The Oscars’. He can vote for the Oscar awards 

In 2017 his Documentary Film ‘Cornered in Molenbeek’ has won Best Belgian Documentary TV Series at Docville Documentary Film Festival.
And also selected for Hot Docs Documentary Film Festival – Official competition

Summer 2016, Sahim had filmed his debut film ‘Zagros’ which has been supported by Vlaams Audiovisueel Fonds (VAF), Dutch Film Fund and Eurimages .

References

External links 
 

Living people
1980 births
Belgian film directors
Kurdish film directors